Smart money index (SMI) or smart money flow index is a technical analysis indicator demonstrating investors' sentiment. The index was invented and popularized by money manager Don Hays.  The indicator is based on intra-day price patterns.

The main idea is that the majority of traders (emotional, news-driven) overreact at the beginning of the trading day because of the overnight news and economic data. There is also much buying on market orders and short covering at the opening. Therefore, the basic strategy is to bet against the morning price trend and bet with the evening price trend. The SMI may be calculated for many markets and market indices (S&P 500, Dow Jones, etc.)

Basic formula
The basic formula for SMI is:

Today's SMI reading = yesterday's SMI – opening gain or loss + last hour change

For example, the SMI closed yesterday at 10000. During the first 30 minutes of today's trading, the Dow Jones has gained a total of 100 points. During the final hour, the Dow Jones has lost 80 points. So, today's SMI is 10000 – 100 + -80 = 9820.

Interpretation
The SMI sends no clear signal whether the market is bullish or bearish. There are also no fixed absolute or relative readings signaling about the trend. Traders need to look at the SMI dynamics relative to that of the market. If, for example, SMI rises sharply when the market falls, this fact would mean that smart money is buying, and the market is to revert to an uptrend soon. The opposite situation is also true. A rapidly falling SMI during a bullish market means that smart money is selling and that market is to revert to a downtrend soon. The SMI is, therefore, a trend-based indicator.

References

External links
Smart Money Index: Accumulation During Decline
Hertler Market Signal Update
Current Readings of the Smart Money Index

Technical indicators